Amy van Keeken is a Canadian musician, as well as a radio DJ for CKUA Radio Network.

History

Performing career 
Amy van Keeken began her performing career initially in acting in Edmonton, Alberta, Canada in the late 1990s. However, beginning in the mid-2000s, van Keeken began to receive recognition for her work as a songwriter and musician. Throughout the 2000s and 2010s, Amy van Keeken performed as a guitarist and vocalist in the Canadian indie rock band the Secretaries. In 2009, van Keeken participated in "That's Edmonton For You," a compilation of musicians from Edmonton including artists such as Cadence Weapon and the Wet Secrets. Van Keeken has also performed with Canadian singer-songwriter Colleen Brown as well as the band the AwesomeHots. In 2017, Capital City Records Podcast described Amy van Keeken as "deep into the Edmonton music scene as a musician, singer, educator and broadcaster on both CJSR and CKUA."

Releases 
In 2014, van Keeken's Live Right received a rating of four out of five stars in the Edmonton Journal. In 2017, van Keeken was nominated for the Edmonton Music Awards in two categories: Female Artist of the Year and Roots/Folk Recording of the Year. Amy van Keeken released her album In Dreams in 2018.

Radio broadcasting 
In 2015, van Keeken began deejaying on CKUA Radio Network.

Discography 
Per MusicBrainz.

with The Secretaries 

 The Secretaries (2009)
 Show Me/The Way I Feel (2014)

with Mysticeti 

 Awake/Asleep (2017)

Solo 
So Long (2013)
Live Right (2014)
So Long/Live Right (2015)
All the Time (2016)
 In Dreams (2018)
 Same Old/Let Me Ease You (2020)

See also 

 Music of Alberta

References

External links 
 Official website
 CKUA webpage

Living people
Canadian women guitarists
Musicians from Edmonton
Musicians from Vancouver
21st-century Canadian women musicians
Year of birth missing (living people)